Thagaraaru is a 2013 Indian Tamil action mystery drama film written and directed by newcomer Ganesh Vinaayac and produced by Cloud Nine Movies. The film stars Arulnithi and Poorna in the lead roles while Jayaprakash, Pawan, Sulile Kumar, and Aadukalam Murugadoss appear in supporting roles. The soundtrack was composed by Dharan, while Praveen Sathya composed the score. Dillraj was the cinematographer, and T. S. Suresh edited the film. The film released on 6 December 2013 and received mixed reviews from critics. Due to the popularity of Madurai Backdrop, The film received generally positive reviews and become an above average hit at the box office.

Plot

Thagararu revolves around the lives of four friends - Saravanan (Arulnithi), Pazhani (Sulile Kumar) Senthil (Pawan), and Aarumugam (Aadukalam Murugadoss) - who live in the city of Madurai. They are orphans who have been together since childhood. Learning to fend for themselves, they fall into bad ways and grow up to be rough, violent, bad-tempered alcoholics who have perfected the art of thievery. They share a special bond, protecting and supporting each other, and have a special affection for Saravanan, the youngest of the lot. Saravanan meets and falls in love with Meenakshi (Poorna), the daughter of a dangerous moneylender, Kanthuvatti Rajendran (Jayaprakash). Though Meenakshi reciprocates his love, she is extremely possessive and resents the love he shares with his friends.  His friends too feel threatened by her and fear that she will separate them. With each robbery, they become more and more arrogant, making numerous enemies and even antagonising a newly appointed inspector of police, who vows to catch them. Towards the end of the first half, Pazhani gets killed. With a long list of people wanting them dead, they have absolutely no clue who is the killer. How they avenge the death of their friend forms the rest of the story.

Cast

Production
Ganesh Vinayaac, associate of Silambarasan, Tharun Gopi and SJ Suryah was supposed to direct Muppozhudhum Un Karpanaigal but was ultimately removed from the film. He then announced a project called Madayan with Simbhu but project never took off and then he was approached by Dayanidhi to direct a film for his cousin Arulnidhi. Arulnidhi who was fresh after the success of Mouna Guru was supposed to do a project called "Ashokamithran" with Karu Pazhaniappan which was dropped accepted to do the project. The film was initially titled as Sambhavam and Pagal Kollai but later changed as Thagaraaru. Pooja was initially approached to play the lead female role but she was busy with other commitments and thus recommended Poorna for the role.

The first day of shoot was held at location where the opening scene of producer's previous film Mankatha was shot, since the producer considered it as "sentimental". The film was entirely shot at Madurai. The last schedule was commenced at 3 June, in Red Hills, Chennai.

Soundtrack 

The songs were composed by Dharan. Initially Raghunanthan was credited as music composer but he was replaced by Dharan as he was busy with other work. Dharan again was not available to compose the score, which was completed by Praveen Sathya. The album have five songs and Ganesh Vinayaac wrote two of them, Super Thirudan and Thiruttu Payapulla. The audio was launched on 18 November 2013 at an FM station through Sony Music. Behindwoods wrote:"Dharan continues to show promise with an album that has some impressive highlights". Milliblog wrote:"Standard fare from Dharan".

 "Annanadai" - Velmurugan, Chinnaponnu
 "Nanba Nanba" - Ananthu
 "Super Thirudan" - Haricharan
 "Thiruttu Payapulla" - Karthik
 "Thagaraaru" theme music

Release
The satellite rights of the film were sold to Sun TV. Trailer of the film was screened during the intermission of Udhayam NH4. The film was given a "U/A" certificate by the Indian Censor Board.

Critical reception
Thagaraaru opened to generally positive reviews from critics. Sify wrote "Thagararu is a well-made fast moving thriller with a terrific climax twist. It's an unpredictable crime drama that combines violence and friendship set in Tamil cinema’s favourite milieu-Madurai". The Hindu wrote, "For quite a while the film meanders through a path of romance and robbery before the director actually decides to steer the course of the story to a bloody end. Writer-director Ganesh Vinaayac gets himself stuck with a story that isn’t convincing and characters that lack stability". The New Indian Express wrote, "Thagararu may be a Madurai story, but it manages to keep one engrossed for the most part, and is worth a watch". Deccan Herald wrote, "Thanks to ensemble performances, snazzy camera work, slick editing, deft direction by Vinaayak, while it sizzles, what, however, makes the experience a bit deja vu is, it reminds Subramaniapuram and a slew of Madurai films. Despite the fussy title, the film is worth a watch". Behindwoods gave 2.5 stars out of 5 and wrote, "Thagaraaru has its share of madurai violence, friendship and cliches, but is a one time watch for its climax".

References

External links
 

2010s Tamil-language films
2013 films
Films shot in Madurai
Indian mystery films
Indian crime drama films
Films set in Madurai
Films scored by Dharan Kumar